Laura Glitz (born May 17, 1967) is an American former professional tennis player.

Biography
Growing up in York, Pennsylvania, Glitz was the PIAA state singles champion in 1984, while a student at York Suburban High School.

Glitz played college tennis for Arizona State University at No. 1 singles and doubles. A doubles All-American in 1987, she served as team captain in her junior and senior years, before graduating in 1990.

In the early 1990s she spent four years competing on the professional tour. Most of her WTA Tour main draw appearances were in doubles and included a runner-up finish at the 1991 Brasil Open. In 1992 she featured in the main draw of the women's doubles at all four grand slam tournaments.

Since 2007, Glitz has been the head coach of the Purdue University women's tennis team.

WTA Tour finals

Doubles (0–1)

References

External links
 
 

1967 births
Living people
American female tennis players
Arizona State Sun Devils women's tennis players
Tennis people from Pennsylvania
Purdue Boilermakers women's tennis coaches
Sportspeople from York, Pennsylvania
American tennis coaches
20th-century American women